Selnica ob Dravi is a village on the left bank of the Drava River in Slovenia. It is the seat of the Municipality of Selnica ob Dravi.

The parish church in the village is dedicated to Saint Margaret and belongs to the Roman Catholic Archdiocese of Maribor. It is built in the centre of the village and was first mentioned in written documents dating to 1372. It is an originally Gothic building with early and late 18th-century additions.

Notable people
 Zinka Zorko (1936–2019), linguist and academic

References

External links
Selnica ob Dravi Geopedia

Populated places in the Municipality of Selnica ob Dravi